El Litral Airport (is an airport  southeast of Quillón, a city in Bío Bío Region of Chile.

The runway has an additional  of unpaved overrun on the south end. The north end has an additional  available.

See also

Transport in Chile
List of airports in Chile
Bulnes Rucamelen Airport

References

External links
OpenStreetMap - El Litral
OurAirports - El Litral
SkyVector - El Litral
FallingRain - El Litral Airport

Airports in Ñuble Region